Arnaud Bovy (born 17 September 2000) is a Belgian tennis player.

Bovy has a career high ATP singles ranking of 570 achieved on 13 January 2020. He also has a career high ATP doubles ranking of 572 achieved on 14 February 2020. He retired from professional tennis in August 2022.

Bovy made his ATP main draw debut at the 2019 European Open after receiving a wildcard for the doubles main draw partnering Steve Darcis.

Challenger and World Tennis Tour Finals

Singles: 4 (1-3)

References

External links

2000 births
Living people
Belgian male tennis players
Sportspeople from Liège
Tennis players at the 2018 Summer Youth Olympics